Southern Oregon University (SOU) is a public university in Ashland, Oregon. It was founded in 1872 as the Ashland Academy, has been in its current location since 1926, and was known by nine other names before assuming its current name in 1997. Its Ashland campus – just 14 miles from Oregon's border with California – encompasses 175 acres. Five of SOU's newest facilities have achieved LEED certification from the U.S. Green Building Council. SOU is headquarters for Jefferson Public Radio and public access station Rogue Valley Community Television. The university has been governed since 2015 by the SOU Board of Trustees.

Southern Oregon University is organized into seven academic divisions: the Oregon Center for the Arts at SOU; Business, Communication and the Environment; Education, Health and Leadership; Humanities and Culture; Social Sciences; Science, Technology, Engineering and Mathematics; and Undergraduate Studies. About 90 bachelor's degree, graduate and certificate programs are offered. Most of SOU's academic programs are on the 10-week quarter system. The university's Oregon Center for the Arts enjoys a collaborative relationship with the Oregon Shakespeare Festival, located in downtown Ashland.

Southern Oregon University is a member of the Council of Public Liberal Arts Colleges and the American Association of State Colleges and Universities.

History
Southern Oregon University began as Ashland Academy in 1872, founded by Ashland's Methodist Episcopal Church. The Rev. Joseph Henry Skidmore served as its first president. In 1878, the school was renamed the Ashland Academy and Commercial College, and then renamed Ashland College and Normal School in 1882, Ashland State Normal School in 1886 and Southern Oregon State Normal School in 1895. While Oregon lawmakers designated the institution in 1882 as an official state normal school – a teachers’ college – the state provided no funding. It closed in 1890 and reopened five years later, still relying on tuition and donations for revenue. The Oregon Legislature finally recognized the institution's needs in 1897 and approved a first-time appropriation of $7,500. The school flourished, but the legislature reversed course in 1909 and eliminated funding for Oregon's normal schools.

Southern Oregon State Normal School closed at the end of the school year and remained shuttered until state funding was reestablished in 1925. The state restarted Southern Oregon State Normal School in Ashland on 24 acres at its current location in 1926. The first building on the new campus was Churchill Hall, named for the college's president, Julius A. Churchill. Ashland residents passed the "Normal School Site Bonds" to purchase the campus property and the legislature approved $175,000 to build the new facility, which now serves as SOU's administrative building. Inlow Hall at Eastern Oregon University was built from a copy of the building plans for Churchill Hall, designed by architect John Bennes in the Renaissance style. In 1932, the Oregon State Board of Higher Education renamed the institute Southern Oregon Normal School.

The school's speech and drama professor, Angus Bowmer, staged a Fourth of July production of Shakespeare's “Merchant of Venice” in 1935, launching what would become the Oregon Shakespeare Festival.

The college received full accreditation from the American Association of Teachers Colleges in 1939, and Oregon Governor Charles A. Sprague signed a bill changing the institution's name to Southern Oregon College of Education.

Elmo Stevenson – for whom the Stevenson Union would later be named – took over as president in 1946 and rebuilt the school's enrollment from a low of 45 at the close of World War II to nearly 800 less than three years after his arrival. He became the institution's longest-serving president to date, retiring in 1969 from what had been renamed Southern Oregon College – to reflect more diverse course offerings – in 1956.

The institution was renamed Southern Oregon State College in 1975 and became Southern Oregon University in 1997. The campus now includes 175 acres with modern facilities, enrollment of more than 6,000 students and more than 1,100 degrees conferred annually.

Academics
Southern Oregon University consists of seven academic divisions: the Oregon Center for the Arts at SOU; Business, Communications and the Environment; Education, Health and Leadership; Humanities and Culture; Social Sciences; Science, Technology, Engineering and Mathematics; and Undergraduate Studies. In addition to the main campus, classes are offered at a Medford facility that SOU shares with Rogue Community College. The Oregon Health & Science University also maintains a school of nursing program at the SOU main campus.

As of the 2019–200 academic year, three SOU faculty members in three years had been awarded Fulbright scholarships to teach, lecture and conduct research at various institutions worldwide.

Southern Oregon University is the first university in the United States to offer a Transgender Studies Certificate 

On February 9, 2021, Southern Oregon University was named #4 on a ranking of "Most Affordable Online Colleges for Students With Learning Disabilities in 2021"

Rogue Community College and Southern Oregon University Higher Education Center
Southern Oregon University and Rogue Community College worked together to implement the guidelines of the white paper "Annexation of Jackson County to the District of Rogue Community College," signed on March 6, 1996. During the 1997–99 biennium, Rogue Community College and Southern Oregon University received regional partnership funding from the legislature to jointly launch several new initiatives to provide additional access for a larger number of residents in southern Oregon. Construction on the downtown Medford center broke ground March 2007 and was completed September 2008. The three-story,  center includes classrooms, science labs, computer labs, a Prometric Testing Center and the Business Center. The Higher Education Center offers lower- and upper-division level courses, as well as three master's degree programs: Master in Business Administration (offered in a cohort format with classes held on Saturdays), Master in Management (courses offered online and at night), and the Master of Arts in Teaching (a two-year, part-time version of the Southern Oregon University one-year Master of Arts in Teaching program).

The presidents of SOU, RCC, Oregon Institute of Technology and Klamath Community College jointly announced in November 2018 their creation of the Southern Oregon Higher Education Consortium. The alliance is intended to streamline students’ educational pathways and address the region's specific workforce needs. Separate meetings of academic officers and enrollment leaders from the four institutions are held regularly to discuss complementary academic programs, transfer agreements and other issues of mutual interest.

Hannon Library
The library was named after Oregon state senator Lenn Hannon after he secured $20 million in government bonds and $3.5 million in private support. The Hannon Library finished construction in 2005. The Oregon State Board of Higher Education initially named the library The Lenn and Dixie Hannon Library but the facility's name was later changed to The Hannon Library. The project almost doubled the size of the existing library and created much-needed room to expand publications and collections. The library also received many technological advancements that provide long-term value for the community.

Publications
The Siskiyou, a student-edited university paper staffed by student reporters and photographers. It is published online periodically during the academic year. The print edition of The Siskiyou began in 1926, and its editorial staff pioneered the shift to an entirely online student newspaper in January 2012. The Siskiyou received top honors in the Oregon Newspaper Publishers Association's Collegiate Newspaper Contest in 2009 and 2018.

SOU News, an online “news portal” managed by the university's Marketing and Communications office, launched in September 2018. It publishes several staff-written stories each week about SOU news and events, and provides daily links to stories about SOU from external media.

Campus life
Many of the majors offered at the university have associated clubs. There are clubs for hobbies, sports and music, and for support for multiculturalism. Southern Oregon University students are involved in community arts. Outside magazine rated Southern Oregon University one of the top 20 schools in the U.S. where students can hit the books and the backcountry.

The Princeton Review named SOU one of the most environmentally responsible colleges in the U.S. and Canada. SOU became the original Bee Campus USA in 2015 and in 2018 it was named the nation's top pollinator-friendly college by the Sierra Club, as part of its annual “Cool Schools” rankings. The university was recognized by the American Association of State Colleges and Universities as the 2019 recipient of AASCU's Excellence and Innovation Award for comprehensive sustainability and sustainable development.

Student activities and support are supplemented by a number of resource centers on campus. The Women's Resource Center, Student Sustainability Center, Commuter Resource Center and Queer Resource Center all provide services, resources and events for their respective communities. The university is represented on the board of directors of the Oregon Student Association and SOU's own 15-member Board of Trustees includes one student member.

There are several Residence Halls on campus, as well as family housing complexes.

 The newest residence hall complex on campus is Raider Village, which includes Shasta and McLoughlin halls, and The Hawk dining commons. The state-of-the-art facility, which was completed in 2013, achieved LEED Gold certification for sustainability.
 The adjacent Greensprings Complex consists of four halls: Applegate, Bear Creek, Crater Lake and Deschutes. The four halls, built in the 1970s, are centered around a large lounge. Greensprings residents share The Hawk dining commons with residents from Shasta and McLoughlin halls.
 Madrone Hall consists of 24 four-bedroom suites, each with two bathrooms, a common kitchen and furnished living room. The Madrone Apartments opened in September 2005.
 Student Apartments and Family Housing is located two blocks from campus and houses more than 200 students, faculty, staff and their families. Units in the Quincy Apartments and Wightman Apartments range from 450-square-foot studios to 1,518-square-foot, four-bedroom units. The university also has houses that are available to qualified students.
 The oldest residence hall on campus that is still in regular use is Madrone Hall. 
 Susanne Homes (Suzy) is now home to the Honors College, Community of Recovery in Education (CORE) program and SOU's McNair Scholars Program. The main area of the building, called "the Fishbowl," is used by all four groups.

Athletics

The Southern Oregon athletic teams are called the Raiders. The university is a member of the National Association of Intercollegiate Athletics (NAIA), primarily competing in the Cascade Collegiate Conference (CCC) for most of its sports since the 1993–94 academic year; while its football team competes in the Frontier Conference, and its wrestling team competes as an Independent.

Southern Oregon competes in 20 intercollegiate varsity sports: Men's sports include basketball, cross country, cycling, football, golf, soccer, track & field and wrestling; women's sports include basketball, beach volleyball, cheerleading, cross country, cycling, dance, golf, soccer, softball, track & field, volleyball and wrestling. Club sports include baseball, crew, judo, lacrosse, rugby, skiing, men's soccer, swimming, men's tennis and ultimate frisbee.

Mascot
The school has the Red-tailed Hawk as their mascot.

Accomplishments
Southern Oregon's football team won the NAIA Football Championship in 2014, and its wrestling team won the National Wrestling Championship four times: in 1978, 1983, 1994, and 2001. The Raiders men's cross country team won the NAIA Men's Cross Country Championship in 2010 and 2016; the men's and women's teams won the NAIA Cross Country Championship Combined Title in 2018; and the women's softball team won the NAIA Softball Championship in 2019 and 2021.

Notable people
 Ted Adams, co-founder and former CEO of IDW Publishing.
 Ty Burrell, actor who graduated with a Bachelor of Fine Arts degree in 1993.
 D'Arcy Carden, actress who graduated with a Bachelor of Fine Arts. 
 Devin Cole, 2001 All-American wrestler; wrestling coach and professional mixed martial artist.
 Todd Field, future Academy Award-nominated filmmaker who, in 1983, attended on a music scholarship.
 Lenn Hannon, Oregon state senator who acquired $20 million in government funding and $3.5 million in private funding for the construction of the library that was later named "Hannon Library".
 Virginia Linder, retired Oregon Supreme Court justice who earned her bachelor's degree in political science at SOU in 1975; she was the court's 99th justice and served from 2007 to 2016.
 Mark Helfrich, football coach, formerly the head coach of the Oregon Ducks football team and formerly the offensive coordinator for the Chicago Bears of the National Football League; starting quarterback for the SOU football team from 1992 to 1995 and earned NAIA All-American status.
 Juan Carlos Romero Hicks, former governor of the Mexican state of Guanajuato, former director of CONACyT and current Mexican senator.
Jose Luis Romero Hicks, Former general director of federal government development bank for international trade BANCOMEXT in Mexico, President of the state of Guanajuato Food Bank for over 25 years, public analyst appears each weekend in the national radio broadcast Living in Mexico
 Lawson Inada, Professor Emeritus who was named Oregon Poet Laureate in 2006, a position that had been vacant since poet William Stafford vacated the post in the early 1990s.
 Jörn Maier, football coach, currently the head coach of the Elmshorn Fighting Pirates in Germany.
 Joel Moore, actor, graduated with a Bachelor of Fine Arts degree in 2001.
 Fred Mossler, former high-ranking executive with Zappos, founder of the Las Vegas-based Mexican restaurant chain Nacho Daddy and philanthropist; he earned a bachelor's degree in business at SOU in 1990.
 Julie Parrish, Oregon State Representative who graduated with a bachelor's degree in communications in 2000.
 Agnes Baker Pilgrim, spiritual elder of the Takelma tribe and chairperson of the International Council of 13 Indigenous Grandmothers graduated in 1985; she received the SOU President's Medal in August 2019 and died in November 2019.
 Kim Rhodes, actress who graduated in 1991.
 Aldrick Rosas, NFL All-Pro placekicker.
 Rick Story, runner-up in the 2006 NAIA National Wrestling Championships; current professional mixed martial arts fighter, competed in the UFC Welterweight division.
 Andrae Thurman, football player who played for the Super Bowl champion Green Bay Packers and United Football League champion Las Vegas Locomotives. Now plays for the Cleveland Gladiators or the Arena Football League.
 Mike Whitehead, retired professional Mixed Martial Arts fighter.

References

External links

 Official website
 Official athletics website

 
1872 establishments in Oregon
Buildings and structures in Ashland, Oregon
Cascade Collegiate Conference
Education in Jackson County, Oregon
Educational institutions established in 1872
Public liberal arts colleges in the United States
Tourist attractions in Jackson County, Oregon
Universities and colleges accredited by the Northwest Commission on Colleges and Universities
Public universities and colleges in Oregon